NGC 4051 is an intermediate spiral galaxy in the constellation of Ursa Major. It was discovered on 6 February 1788 by John Herschel.

NGC 4051 contains a supermassive black hole with a mass of 1.73 million . This galaxy was studied by the Multicolor Active Galactic Nuclei Monitoring 2m telescope. Several supernovae have been discovered in NGC 4051: SN 1983I, SN 2010br, and SN 2003ie.

The galaxy is a Seyfert galaxy that emits bright X-rays.  However, in early 1998 the X-ray emission ceased as observed by the Beppo-SAX satellite. X-ray emission had risen back to normal by August 1998.

NGC 4051 is a member of the Ursa Major Cluster. Its peculiar velocity is −490 ± 34 km/s, consistent with the rest of the cluster.

References

Notes

External links

SN 2010br located 19".5 east and 10" south of the center at 12 03 10.96 +44 31 42.8 / Wikisky DSS2 zoom-in of same region

Ursa Major Cluster
Ursa Major (constellation)
Seyfert galaxies
Intermediate spiral galaxies
4051
038068